Howard "Dutch" Darrin (1897–1982) was an American free-lance automotive stylist born in Cranford, New Jersey.

Darrin had been a US pilot serving in France in the last years of World War I when he met fellow countryman Thomas Hibbard. They were employed after the war as designers by Brewster & Co which they left. Hibbard had helped to establish LeBaron and taking Darrin visited France to supervise construction of some LeBaron bodies in Paris. They then stayed on in Paris and established first their own design practice, then set up their own factory in Paris: Hibbard & Darrin at Puteaux.

Undercapitalised, they were forced to shut down by the financial crisis of 1929 which badly affected their American backer's resources. Hibbard took a design position back home in General Motors. After a second successful partnership in Paris, known as Carrosserie Fernandez et Darrin, Howard Darrin returned home in 1937 and settled in Hollywood.

Darrin left France and set up a practice in Hollywood at the end of the 1930s and designed special automobile bodies on luxury chassis for Hollywood stars. He also developed an association with the Packard Motor Company and his designs for Packard were produced in relatively short runs by plants sited nearer Packard's own home. Production seems to have ended with the onset of World War II.

References

1897 births
1982 deaths
American automobile designers
People from Cranford, New Jersey
People in the automobile industry
American expatriates in France